Nizhegorodsky Uyezd (Нижегородский уезд) was one of the subdivisions of the Nizhny Novgorod Governorate of the Russian Empire. It was situated in the central part of the governorate. Its administrative centre was Nizhny Novgorod.

Demographics
At the time of the Russian Empire Census of 1897, Nizhegorodsky Uyezd had a population of 222,033. Of these, 97.6% spoke Russian, 1.0% Yiddish, 0.4% Tatar, 0.4% Polish, 0.2% German, 0.1% Belarusian and 0.1% Ukrainian as their native language.

References

 
Uezds of Nizhny Novgorod Governorate
Nizhny Novgorod Governorate